Eggman or Egg Man may refer to:
 "Egg Man", a song by the Beastie Boys
 Doctor Eggman, also known as Doctor Ivo Robotnik, a fictional character and the main antagonist of Sega's Sonic the Hedgehog series.
 Eggman, a moniker used by Sice Rowbottom, formerly of the Boo Radleys
 Eggman, a character mentioned in the Beatles' 1967 song "I Am the Walrus"
 The Egg Man, a fictional character in the John Waters film Pink Flamingos
 Susan Eggman, California state assemblymember